The Cascade River is a  river in northeastern Minnesota, United States. Running through Cook County, it debouches into Lake Superior between Grand Marais and Lutsen.  Its lower courses flow through Cascade River State Park.

The river was named for a number of waterfalls near its mouth.

See also
List of rivers of Minnesota

References

Rivers of Cook County, Minnesota
Rivers of Minnesota
Tributaries of Lake Superior
Northern Minnesota trout streams